The 2018 ACC Eastern Region T20 was a Twenty20 (T20) cricket tournament held in Thailand from 21 to 25 February 2018. The four participating teams in the first edition of this new event were the national sides of Bhutan, China, Myanmar and hosts Thailand. The matches were all played at the Terdthai Cricket Ground in Bangkok. Matches did not have Twenty20 International status, but matches played in future editions will following the decision of the ICC to grant full Twenty20 International status to all its members from 1 January 2019. The first day's action saw comfortable wins for Bhutan and Thailand over China and Myanmar, respectively. Thailand secured a place in the final by defeating Bhutan on day two, following on from China's win against Myanmar. The third day was lost due to rain with both scheduled matches abandoned, which meant that Bhutan joined Thailand in the final. The final day's play-offs saw Myanmar edge past China by five runs to claim third place, and then Bhutan defeat Thailand by three runs to take the title.

Bhutan's captain Jigme Singye was named as player of the tournament, fellow Bhutanese player Suprit Pradhan was named bowler of the tournament, and the best batsman award was given to Thailand's captain Daniel Jacobs.

Squads

Round-robin

Points table

Matches
Summaries and player of the match winners, along with downloadable scorecards, can be found on the ACC website.

Play-offs

Third-place play-off

Final

References

External links
 Series home at ESPN Cricinfo

International cricket competitions in 2017–18
International cricket competitions in Thailand